Margate is a coastal resort in the county of Kent, in the United Kingdom.

Margate may also refer to:

Places
 Margate, Queensland, Australia
 Margate, Tasmania, Australia
 Margate, Prince Edward Island, Canada
 Margate, KwaZulu-Natal, South Africa
 Margate, Florida, US
 Margate City, New Jersey, US

Music
 Margate (band), a Southern California melodic rock band
 "Margate" (song), by Chas & Dave, 1982

Other uses
 Margate, a fish in the family Haemulidae